Balanus trigonus is a species of barnacle in the family Balanidae. It is steep-sided, conical barnacle, has six shell plates and is pink in colour. They are opportunistic fouling organisms that are endemic to the Indo-Pacific region.

References

Barnacles
Crustaceans described in 1854
Taxa named by Charles Darwin